Jo Metson Scott is a British portrait and documentary photographer, based in London. Her book, The Grey Line, is about British and American soldiers who dissented to the Iraq War.

Life and work
Metson Scott was born in Exeter. She has also lived in West Bridgford, Rushcliffe, Nottinghamshire. She earned a BA in Photography from Birmingham Institute of Art and Design (a faculty of Birmingham City University) in 2002. After University she moved to London and assisted various photographers. She works commercially for magazines and newspapers as well as making personal work.

Commissioned by Nottingham Castle Museum and Art Gallery in 2009, Metson Scott made portraits of "local people with fascinating stories" for an exhibition at the gallery titled Tales from the City.

Over the course of two years she photographed a member of Great Britain's gymnastic squad, preparing for the 2012 Summer Olympics in London (at which time he was 12 years old). This work was exhibited at B Store in London in 2012.

Her book The Grey Line, published 10 years after the 2003 invasion of Iraq, is "a reflection on the war told from the perspective of Britain and American soldiers who have spoken out against the invasion" and "also a reflection of the fallout of such a stance." The book, five years in the making, contains images of veterans and "their story presented through their own handwritten testimonies."

Publications

Publications by Metson Scott
The Grey Line. Stockport: Dewi Lewis, 2013. . Edition of 650 copies.

Publications with contributions by Metson Scott
Invisible Britain. Bristol: Policy, 2018. Edited by Paul Sng. . With a foreword by Michael Sheen.

Solo exhibitions
Tales from the City, Nottingham Castle Museum and Art Gallery, Nottingham, 2010
Gym Boy, B Store, London, 2012

Awards
2012: Firecracker Photographic Grant for The Grey Line

See also
Dissent by military officers and enlisted personnel
Opposition to the Iraq War
Samuel Provance – included in The Grey Line

References

External links

Interview with Metson Scott about The Grey Line, with photographs, in Prison Photography

British portrait photographers
English women photographers
Alumni of Birmingham Institute of Art and Design
Artists from Exeter
Living people
Year of birth missing (living people)
Photographers from Devon